"Billy the Mountain" is a Frank Zappa song first made available on the album Just Another Band from L.A. in 1972. The original recording, which took more than a half-hour to perform, was from a live tour performance on August 7, 1971, in Los Angeles, performed by Zappa with his band the Mothers and prominently featured the musical duo Flo & Eddie. The album recording had to be edited in order to fit on one side of the record. An alternate version of the song was featured on the 1992 album Playground Psychotics, and a third version of the song was posthumously released in 2011 by the Zappa Family Trust on the album Carnegie Hall.

The song is an intricate and absurd story in a parody of the song/story style of works such as "Peter and the Wolf" about a talking mountain named Billy and his "lovely wife Ethel," "a tree growing off of his shoulder." The lyrics are a satirical myriad of monoculture imagery, the city of Los Angeles, the demise of urban America, and overall absurd juxtapositions of situations. While many of the details were improvised as the song was performed from town to town, the general structure of the song remained the same.

In 2009 Dweezil Zappa and his Zappa Plays Zappa ensemble performed "Billy the Mountain" as part of its "You Can't Fit on Stage Anymore" tour of small venues in the US.

Notes

External links
 Billy the Mountain Lyrics
 Changes and Improvisation in the Billy the Mountain Script between live performances

1972 songs
Frank Zappa songs
Songs about California
Songs about Los Angeles
Fictional mountains
Songs about mountains
Songs about fictional male characters
Satirical songs
Compositions with a narrator
Song recordings produced by Frank Zappa